Raza Kazim (born 13 January 1930) is a lawyer, philosopher, inventor and former politician in Pakistan.

Family
He invented a musical instrument, the Sagar Veena, of which his daughter Noor Zehra is the only player in Pakistan, and through her is the grandfather of the famous pop-rock band Noori duo, Ali Noor and Ali Hamza, while another daughter, Baela Raza Jamil, is one of Pakistan's leading educators, with major contributions in the field of education reform. He is also the uncle of actress and model Juggan Kazim.

Politics
He began his political career with a protest in his school during the Quit India Movement, in 1942, and joined the Communist Party of Pakistan in 1948 for some time before quitting it for ideological reasons in 1951, while he became a lawyer in 1953, and as an activist has been jailed under Ayyub Khan, Zulfiqar Ali Bhutto as well as Zia-ul-Haq, the first two for refusing to become a minister, and the third for supposedly attempting a coup d'état. He later on abandoned leftist politics and Marxism altogether, after having studied it for some two decades but ultimately writing a "50-page article on gaps in facts and reasoning in dialectical and historical materialism", and now describes himself as a "post-Marxist."

Later activities
He currently devotes his time to the Sanjan Nagar Institute of Philosophy & Arts, a non-profit organization consisting of a team of fifty (now growing) full-time members working in the fields of Philosophy, Music and Photography. The Institute is currently based in Lahore.

Books and booklets
Notes on theoretical aspects of revolution, 1972.
Socialist revolution : the alternative to disaster, 1974.
Dictatorship of the urban left : Pakistan's road to socialism, 1974.
Pākistānī inqilāb aur Islām, 1976.
Raz̤ā Kāẓim : mushāhidāt, 1986.

References

Living people
Pakistani music critics
Pakistani lawyers
Pakistani activists
Pakistani inventors
Pakistani prisoners and detainees
Pakistani philosophers
Pakistan People's Party politicians
Punjabi people
Veena players
Lawyers from Lahore
Politicians from Lahore
1930 births